Christopher Purves (born in Cambridge) is an English bass-baritone.

Career
Purves sang with Opera North in several productions in the seasons 1997 to 2004 and later. He performed with The Sixteen and has an extensive discography. Purves featured on the CD cover as Figaro in Opera in English's release of Mozart's The Marriage of Figaro in 2004. He was one of the artists on the Lamenti recital (Virgin Classics) which won Record of the Year in 2009 at France's Victoires de la musique classique. He premiered the role of Protector in George Benjamin's 2012 opera, Written on Skin, and the role of Walt Disney in Philip Glass's 2013 opera The Perfect American.

In 2016, Purves was the bass soloist in Beethoven's Ninth at the Proms and later in the year played the title character in Don Giovanni with ENO.

Background
A choral scholar at King’s College, Cambridge, Purves went on to become a member of retro close harmony group Harvey and the Wallbangers.

Selected discography
 Marc-Antoine Charpentier: Leçons de Ténèbres - Office du Mercredi Saint, H.120, H.138, H.141, H.117, H.131, H.126 and Miserere H.173 - C. Greuillet, C. Pelon, C. Purves,  Gérard Lesne, Il Seminario Musicale - Virgin Classics, CD 5451072 (1995).
George Frideric Handel: Finest Arias for Base Voice, Arcangelo, Jonathan Cohen, Hyperion Records (2013)

References

External links
 "Christopher Purves interview: From doo-wop to new opera", Rupert Christiansen, The Daily Telegraph, 2 March 2013.
 "Christopher Purves website"

English operatic baritones
Living people
Date of birth missing (living people)
Alumni of King's College, Cambridge
English bass-baritones
Operatic bass-baritones
20th-century British male opera singers
21st-century British male opera singers
Year of birth missing (living people)
Choristers of the Choir of King's College, Cambridge